Amok is a 1944 Mexican romantic drama film directed by Antonio Momplet and starring María Félix and Julián Soler. The film is based on the novel Der Amokläufer by author Stefan Zweig.

Plot
A doctor (Julián Soler) embezzles the proceeds of his Parisian clinic in order to better support the manipulative woman (María Félix) with whom he is having an affair. After losing all the money while gambling, he is forced to flee to an undeveloped region of India. There, he tries to mitigate the onslaught of a disease the natives term "Amok", while his past mistakes still plague him, especially when a mysterious woman, Mrs. Belmont (María Félix), appears in his office. The surprising physical resemblance of the woman with her previous lover will end up driving him insane.

Cast
 María Félix as Madame Travis / Mrs. Belmont
 Julián Soler as Dr. Jorge Martell
 Stella Inda as Tara
 Miguel Ángel Ferriz as Governor
 José Baviera as Mr. Belmont
 Paco Fuentes as Dr. Rozier
 Miguel Arenas as Jorge's Uncle
 Kali Karlo as Servant
 Carolina Barret as Rosa, maid
 Gustavo Rojo
 Arturo Soto Rangel as Don Eduardo
 Lupe del Castillo as Old Abortionist (as Guadalupe del Castillo)
 José Goula as Luis Blumenthal
 Enrique Cancino	
 Carlos Aguirre
 Eduardo Noriega as Governor's Nephew
 Roberto Cañedo as Man in Casino (uncredited)
 Manuel Dondé as Indigenous Man (uncredited)
 Ana María Hernández as Woman in Casino (uncredited)
 Salvador Lozano as Man in Casino (uncredited)
 Manuel Pozos (uncredited)

References

External links

Amok on FilmAffinity

1944 romantic drama films
1944 films
Mexican black-and-white films
Films based on works by Stefan Zweig
Films directed by Antonio Momplet
1940s Spanish-language films
Mexican romantic drama films
1940s Mexican films